Pachymeta is a genus of moths in the family Lasiocampidae. The genus was erected by Per Olof Christopher Aurivillius in 1906.

Species
Pachymeta capreolus Aurivillius, 1915
Pachymeta contraria Walker, 1855
Pachymeta immunda Holland, 1893
Pachymeta semifasciata Aurivillius

References

Lasiocampidae